Jacques Tétreault (8 April 1929 – 20 August 2018) was a Canadian politician and lawyer who was a member of the House of Commons of Canada from 1988 to 1993. His background was in law.

He was elected in the 1988 federal election at the Laval-des-Rapides electoral district for the Progressive Conservative party. He served in the 34th Canadian Parliament but did not seek another term in Parliament in the 1993 federal election.

Tétrault had also previously served as mayor of Laval between 1965 and 1973.  He also was a leadership candidate for the Union Nationale in May 1976, but was defeated by Rodrigue Biron.

A street near the Montmorency metro station in Laval is named after him.

References

External links
 

1929 births
2018 deaths
French Quebecers
Lawyers from Montreal
Mayors of Laval, Quebec
Members of the House of Commons of Canada from Quebec
Politicians from Montreal
Progressive Conservative Party of Canada MPs